Ciconia maltha, also known as the asphalt stork or La Brea stork, is an extinct stork from the Late Pliocene – Late Pleistocene of United States (California, Oregon, Idaho and Florida), Cuba and Bolivia. It has been found in the La Brea Tar Pits.

References

maltha
Pliocene birds of North America
Pleistocene birds of North America
Pleistocene extinctions
Fossils of Cuba
Fossil taxa described in 1910
Birds described in 1910